Humayun Azizi is an Afghan physician who served as a governor of Kandahar Province, Afghanistan, from April 2015 until 2017. He has previously been state minister for parliamentary affairs. He has been the Ambassador to the Netherlands since August 2017.

Career
Humayun Azizi is a Pashtun from the Herat Province. He obtained his PhD in medicine from the Kabul Medical University. He was a doctor in a Herati hospital from 2000 to 2003. A general surgeon, he soon became head of Burn Unit at Herat Zone Hospital in 2002. Alongside his profession, he was also interested and active in social and political affairs of Afghanistan. In 2005 Azizi was elected as member of Provincial Council of Herat and chaired the council for 4 years. In 2004 Azizi resumed his further studies in plastic surgery in France and received his certificate in 2009.

Humayun Azizi has been supporting cultural and civil society organizations in Herat province. In 2009, he established Afghanistan Islamic Civil Partnership assembly, and he is still running the assembly in order to create opportunities for Afghan youth and other civil organizations in the country. He was appointed Minister of State for Parliamentary Affairs of the Islamic Republic of Afghanistan in 2010. Moreover, Azizi was a member of regional Peace Loya Jirga, Peace Consultative Jirga and Traditional Loya Jirga, and he was appointed as a member of Preparation Committee of Traditional Loya Jirga by president Hamid Karzai in 2011. He is also an active member of the National Security Council of Afghanistan. In April 2015, president Mohammad Ashraf Ghani appointed Azizi the new provincial governor for the southern Kandahar Province of Afghanistan.

Assassination attempt

On January 11, 2017, Azizi was injured from an explosion at the governor's compound. He was hosting a welcome dinner to an Emirati diplomatic mission who were on a humanitarian mission to open an orphanage in Kandahar. A total of 13 people were killed among them 5 Emirati diplomats and 18 were injured in the explosion, including Azizi and the United Arab Emirates Ambassador to Afghanistan Juma Al Kaabi. His subsequent hospitalization lasted 2 months.

References

1974 births
Living people
Governors of Kandahar Province
People from Herat
Afghan activists